Gavin Bailey (born 1995) is an Irish hurler who plays for Wexford Championship club Ferns St Aidan's and at inter-county level with the Wexford senior hurling team. He usually plays as a right wing-back.

Honours

Wexford 
 Leinster Senior Hurling Championship: 2019
 Leinster Under-21 Hurling Championship: 2014 , 2015

References

1995 births
Living people
Ferns St Aidan's hurlers
Wexford inter-county hurlers